The 2008 United States presidential election in Vermont took place on November 4, 2008, concurrent with the federal election in all 50 states and D.C., which was part of the 2008 United States presidential election. Voters chose three representatives, or electors to the Electoral College, who voted for president and vice president.

Vermont was won by Democratic nominee Barack Obama with 67.46%, to Republican John McCain's 30.45%, a Democratic victory margin of 37.01%.

Obama carried every county by more than 60% of the vote with the exception of Essex County, which he won with 56%. He also broke 70% in 3 counties. A very liberal Northeastern state, Vermont was the second most Democratic state in the nation, weighing in as a whopping 30% more Democratic than the national average in the 2008 election. Obama's landslide win in Vermont outperformed Lyndon Johnson's 1964 Democratic landslide in the state, making the results of 2008 the strongest Democratic victory in Vermont's history.

Primaries
 2008 Vermont Democratic presidential primary
 2008 Vermont Republican presidential primary

Campaign

Predictions 
There were 16 news organizations who made state-by-state predictions of the election. Here are their last predictions before election day:

Polling

Obama won every single pre-election poll, and each with a double-digit margin of victory. The final 3 polls averaged Obama leading 59% to 35%.

Fundraising
Obama raised a total of $2,071,271 in the state. McCain raised $206,395.

Advertising and visits
Neither campaign spent any money on advertising in Vermont. Neither campaign visited the state.

Analysis
Vermont was once the quintessential Yankee Republican state. It identified with the newly formed GOP in 1856 and remained in the Republican fold for over 130 years. From 1856 to 1988, it only voted for a Democrat once, in Lyndon Johnson's 44-state landslide of 1964. Vermont and Maine were the only states that Franklin D. Roosevelt didn't carry in any of his four elections.

However, the brand of Republicanism practiced in the Green Mountain State has historically been a moderate one. Coupled with an influx of more liberal newcomers from out of state, this made Vermont considerably friendlier to Democrats as the national GOP moved further to the right. After narrowly supporting George H. W. Bush in 1988, Vermont gave Bill Clinton a 16-point margin in 1992. Republicans have not seriously contested the state since then, and Vermont is now reckoned as part of a bloc of solidly blue states spanning most of the Northeast.

The 2008 race kept this tradition going. Obama won with 67% of the vote to McCain's 30%. The state was called for Obama almost as soon as the polls closed, and was the first state called for Obama.

Vermont was Obama's second-best state and his best in the contiguous 48 states; only topped by the staggering 71% he received in Hawaii, the state where he was born. The Obama-Biden ticket won every county in the state, including several north eastern counties which had a history of voting Republican. Obama also performed better than John Kerry in every county. As a measure of how Republican Vermont once was, George W. Bush was at the time the only Republican to win the White House without carrying Vermont.

Results

 Write-ins include Cynthia McKinney, Green.
 Others include Róger Calero, Socialist Workers; Gloria La Riva, Socialism and Liberation; and Brian Moore, Liberty Union.

By county

Counties that flipped from Republican to Democratic 

 Essex (largest town: Lunenburg)

By congressional district
Due to the state's low population, only one congressional district is allocated. This district, called the At-Large district because it covers the entire state, is thus equivalent to the statewide election results.

Electors

Technically the voters of Vermont, as they do in every state, cast their ballots for electors: representatives to the Electoral College. Vermont  is allocated three electors because it has 1 congressional district and 2 senators. All candidates who appear on the ballot or qualify to receive write-in votes must submit a list of 3 electors, who pledge to vote for their candidate and his or her running mate. Whoever wins the majority of votes in the state is awarded all 3 electoral votes. Their chosen electors then vote for president and vice president. Although electors are pledged to their candidate and running mate, they are not obligated to vote for them. An elector who votes for someone other than his or her candidate is known as a faithless elector.

The electors of each state and the District of Columbia met on December 15, 2008, to cast their votes for president and vice president. The Electoral College itself never meets as one body. Instead the electors from each state and the District of Columbia met in their respective capitols.

The following were elected at large as members of the Electoral College from the state. All three were pledged to Barack Obama and Joe Biden:
Claire Ayer
 Euan Bear
 Kevin Christie

See also
 United States presidential elections in Vermont

References

External links
 General election results
 Democratic primary
 Republican primary
 Liberty Union primary

Vermont
2008
2008